Orland Park 143rd Street is one of three stations on Metra's SouthWest Service in Orland Park, Illinois. In Metra's zone-based fare system, 143rd Street is in zone E. As of 2018, Orland Park 143rd Street is the 86th busiest of Metra's 236 non-downtown stations, with an average of 591 weekday boardings.

As of January 16, 2023, Orland Park 143rd Street is served by all 30 trains (15 in each direction) on weekdays. One of the outbound trains that stops at the station makes a flag stop. Saturday service is currently suspended.

The station faced major reconstruction and reopened on April 27, 2007. From this station southward the SouthWest Service operates on one track only.

This station has been recognized as being a major piece in Orland Park's downtown.

References

Greco, Jr. Carmen; "New depot spurs big dreams - Orland Park plans a new downtown" ''Chicago Tribune; April 27, 2007

External links 

Metra stations in Illinois
Railway stations in Cook County, Illinois
143rd Street
Former Wabash Railroad stations